Dolichopentas is a genus of flowering plants in the family Rubiaceae. The genus is found in tropical Africa.

Species
Dolichopentas decora (S.Moore) Kårehed & B.Bremer
Dolichopentas decora var. decora
Dolichopentas decora var. lasiocarpa (Verdc.) Kårehed & B.Bremer
Dolichopentas decora var. triangularis (De Wild.) Kårehed & B.Bremer
Dolichopentas liebrechtsiana (De Wild.) Kårehed & B.Bremer
Dolichopentas lindenioides (S.Moore) Kårehed & B.Bremer
Dolichopentas longiflora (Oliv.) Kårehed & B.Bremer

References

External links
Dolichopentas in the World Checklist of Rubiaceae

Rubiaceae genera
Knoxieae
Flora of Africa
Taxa named by Birgitta Bremer